Amphibolus may refer to:
 Amphibolus (bug), a genus of true bugs in the family Reduviidae
 Amphibolus, a genus of tardigrades in the family Eohypsibiidae, synonym of Bertolanius
 Amphibolus, a genus of beetles in the family Ptinidae, synonym of Episernus

See also
 Amphibolusa, a genus of beetles